The Hongshi Dam is a gravity dam on the Second Songhua River located  east of Huadian in Jilin Province, China. The primary purpose of the dam is hydroelectric power generation and its power plant has an installed capacity of 200 MW. Construction on the dam began in 1982 and the reservoir began to fill in November 1985. The first generator was operational in December 1985 and the last in October 1987. The Baishan Dam is located upstream and the Fengman Dam downstream.

See also

List of dams and reservoirs in China

References

Dams in China
Hydroelectric power stations in Jilin
Gravity dams
Dams completed in 1985
Dams on the Second Songhua River